Batman: Dark Moon Rising is a two-part comic book series written by Matt Wagner about the superhero Batman. It contains two six-part miniseries entitled Batman and the Monster Men and Batman and the Mad Monk. The two series take place after the events of Batman: Year One and before Batman: The Man Who Laughs.

Batman and the Monster Men
Batman and the Monster Men has Batman have his first encounter with Professor Hugo Strange and his hulking Monster Men. It also introduces Julie Madison, as well as her father Norman, to the Post-Crisis continuity and revealing that Sal Maroni was involved in the funding for Strange's project on Arkham Asylum's patients.

Characters involved
Bruce Wayne/Batman
Julie Madison
Professor Hugo Strange
Sal Maroni
Norman Madison
James Gordon
Alfred Pennyworth

Continuity changes
Julie Madison is now a law student instead of an actress.
Norman Madison is introduced.
Sal Maroni is involved in the funding for Hugo Strange's project on Arkham Asylum's patients.

Batman and the Mad Monk
Batman and the Mad Monk has Batman battling the vampiric Monk. Julie Madison and Norman Madison return.

Characters involved 
Bruce Wayne/Batman
Julie Madison
Norman Madison
Alfred Pennyworth
James Gordon
The Monk
Dala

Continuity changes
Dala is not a vampire like she was in the original story.
The Monk is now Niccolai, the vampiric leader of the cult known as the Brotherhood.
Julie joins the UN Peace Corps and goes to Africa after the death of her father instead of becoming the Grace Kelly analogue Princess Portia Storme, ruler of Moldacia.

References

Comics by Matt Wagner